Modiolastrum is a genus of flowering plants belonging to the family Malvaceae.

Its native range is Bolivia to Southern Brazil and Northern Argentina.

Species
Species:

Modiolastrum australe 
Modiolastrum gilliesii 
Modiolastrum lateritium 
Modiolastrum malvifolium 
Modiolastrum palustre 
Modiolastrum pinnatipartitum

References

Malveae
Malvaceae genera